In music, Op. 63 stands for Opus number 63. Compositions that are assigned this number include:

 Alkan – Esquisses
 Arnold – Symphony No. 3
 Britten – Missa Brevis
 Bruch – Swedish Dances
 Chopin – Mazurkas, Op. 63
 Elgar – Symphony No. 2
 Lyapunov – Piano Sextet
 Prokofiev – Violin Concerto No. 2
 Schumann – Piano Trio No. 1
 Shostakovich – The Gamblers
 Sibelius – Symphony No. 4
 Strauss – Josephslegende
 Weber – Trio for Piano, Flute and Cello